The South African War Memorial is a memorial located at University Avenue and Queen Street West in Toronto, Ontario, Canada.

Commissioned in 1910, largely as the result of the efforts of James Mason, and designed by Walter Seymour Allward to commemorate Canada's participation in the Boer War, it consists of three bronze figures at the base of a granite column. Another bronze figure is found at the top of the memorial. It was restored in 2001.

The Ontario Heritage Foundation plaque for this memorial erroneously states that Walter Allward studied under Emanuel Hahn; in fact, it was the other way around.

For two decades after the war, Canadians would gather on February 27 (known in Canada as "Paardeberg Day") around memorials to the South African War to say prayers and honour veterans. This continued until the end of the First World War, when Armistice Day (later called Remembrance Day) began to be observed on November 11. The monument was unveiled in 1910 by Sir John French.

See also 
 Canadian war memorials

References 

 South African War Memorial
 Photographs

Sculptures by Walter Seymour Allward
Monuments and memorials in Toronto
Canadian military memorials and cemeteries
Second Boer War memorials